Predrag Sikimić (born 29 August 1982) is a Serbian former footballer who played as a striker.

He is the younger brother of Milovan Sikimić.

Career

FK Voždovac
On 11 January 2019, Sikimic signed with FK Voždovac.

Honours

Club
Red Star Belgrade
 Serbian SuperLiga: 2015–16

References

External links
 
 Predrag Sikimić stats at utakmica.rs 
 
 

1982 births
Living people
Sportspeople from Smederevo
Serbian footballers
Serbian expatriate footballers
Association football forwards
Lierse S.K. players
FK Timok players
FK Rad players
FK Vojvodina players
FC Amkar Perm players
FC Ural Yekaterinburg players
FK Radnički 1923 players
FK Smederevo players
PAE Kerkyra players
FK Voždovac players
Red Star Belgrade footballers
FC Atyrau players
NK Domžale players
FK Železničar Pančevo players
Serbian SuperLiga players
Belgian Pro League players
Russian Premier League players
Football League (Greece) players
Predrag Sikimic
Kazakhstan Premier League players
Slovenian PrvaLiga players
Serbian First League players
Serbian expatriate sportspeople in Belgium
Serbian expatriate sportspeople in Russia
Serbian expatriate sportspeople in Greece
Serbian expatriate sportspeople in Thailand
Serbian expatriate sportspeople in Kazakhstan
Serbian expatriate sportspeople in Slovenia
Expatriate footballers in Belgium
Expatriate footballers in Russia
Expatriate footballers in Greece
Expatriate footballers in Thailand
Expatriate footballers in Kazakhstan
Expatriate footballers in Slovenia